Lemmington Hall is  an 18th-century country mansion incorporating a 15th-century tower house, situated near Edlingham, Northumberland, England. It is a Grade II* listed building. The original tower house built for the Beadnall family in the early 15th century was a four-storey construction which was reduced in height in the 17th century when Nicholas Fenwick (Mayor of Newcastle 1720) converted the building into a country house.

Despite substantial alterations and improvements by architect William Newton in the late 18th century, the property had become a roofless ruin by the end of the 19th century. It was completely restored by Sir Stephen Aitchison (see Aitchison baronets), who acquired the ruinous property in 1913.

In 1927 Aitchison bought an  column, designed by Sir John Soane dedicated to the memory of members of the Evelyn family of Felbridge, Surrey, which he dismantled and re-erected in the grounds at Lemmington.

In 1825 the property was acquired by William Pawson of Shawdon Hall (High Sheriff of Northumberland in 1826) and in 1947 was converted for use as a convent for the Sisters of the Sacred Heart. More recently the house has been used as a residential care home.

The hall has recently been renovated; it is under ownership of the Ruff family.

The Ruff family also own a selection of animals on the Lemmington Hall estate including peacocks and peahens.

Forge Cottage

After completion of renovating Lemmington Hall the Ruff family also took on the responsibility to renovate several of the outbuildings. One of them was forge cottage, this has been transformed into a luxury holiday cottage, previous to it being a holiday rental it was a dilapidated building which was once home to the local blacksmith of the area.

References
 
   Structures of the North East

Grade II* listed buildings in Northumberland
Country houses in Northumberland